
Year 380 BC was a year of the pre-Julian Roman calendar. At the time, it was known as the Year of the Tribunate of Poplicola, Poplicola, Maluginensis, Lanatus, Peticus, Mamercinus, Fidenas, Crassus and Mugillanus (or, less frequently, year 374 Ab urbe condita). The denomination 380 BC for this year has been used since the early medieval period, when the Anno Domini calendar era became the prevalent method in Europe for naming years.

Events 
 By place 
 Persian empire 
Persia forces the Athenians to withdraw their general Chabrias from Egypt. Chabrias has been successfully supporting the Egyptian Pharaohs in maintaining their independence from the Persian Empire.

 Egypt 
 The Egyptian Pharaoh Hakor dies and is succeeded by his son Nepherites II, but the latter is overthrown by Nectanebo I within the year, ending the Twenty-ninth dynasty of Egypt. Nectanabo (or more properly Nekhtnebef) becomes the first Pharaoh of the Thirtieth dynasty of Egypt.

 Greece 
 Cleombrotus I succeeds his brother Agesipolis I as king of Sparta.

 By topic 
 Art 
 What some historians call the Rich style in Greece comes to an end.

Births 
 Darius III, king of (Achaemenid) Persia (approximate date)
 Menaechmus, Greek mathematician and geometer (d. 320 BC)
 Pytheas, Greek explorer, who will explore northwestern Europe, including the British Isles (d. c. 310 BC) (approximate date)

Deaths 
 Agesipolis I, king of Sparta
 Philoxenus of Cythera, Greek dithyrambic poet (b. 435 BC)
 Hakor, king of the Twenty-ninth dynasty of Egypt
 Nefaarud II, son of Hakor and last king of the Twenty-ninth dynasty

References